The BA-11 or Broneavtomobil 11 was an armored car developed in the Soviet Union.  It was intended to replace the BA-10, but production was prevented by the Nazi German invasion of 1941.  The BA-11 was a heavy armored car designed based on a strengthened ZiS-6K chassis.  Used during 1941–1942 on the Leningrad front, it was designed to attack infantry, cavalry, and medium armored cars. With 13mm of frontal armour, it was only slightly less protected than the most common Soviet light tank of the era, the T-26, which had 15mm of armour. It had very poor off-road mobility due to being overloaded and lacking all wheel drive, so only 17 were built and all of them were lost in 1941–42. One BA-11 was modified with ZiS D-7 96hp diesel engine, it was known as BA-11D. Trials were successful, but uselessness of BA-11 removed necessity of BA-11D serial production.

References

World War II armoured cars
World War II armoured fighting vehicles of the Soviet Union